Robert Alastair Addie (10 February 1960 – 20 November 2003) was an English film and theatre actor, who came to prominence playing the role of Sir Guy of Gisbourne in the 1980s British television drama series Robin of Sherwood.

Early life
Addie was born in south London on 10 February 1960. During his early childhood he was adopted by Marjorie and Jack Williams and raised in Sapperton, in the county of Gloucestershire. He received his formal education at Marlborough College and Magdalen College School, Brackley. After initially being employed as a trainee estate agent on a ranch in Argentina, he returned to England and joined the National Youth Theatre in London in 1976 at the age of 16. Subsequently he trained in acting at the Royal Academy of Dramatic Art, which he left early after successfully auditioning for the role of Mordred in the film Excalibur (1981).

Career
Addie's slim but athletic physique, and attractive yet stern looks, voice and demeanour, channelled his career into that of a character actor from its outset, with his usually being cast as a supporting player in authoritarian roles. This aspect of his repertoire combined with his excellent horsemanship and weapons-handling skills found him regularly appearing in historical dramas set in the medieval era.   

At the beginning of his career in the early 1980s he appeared on British television in a number of commercial advertisements, ranging from one for Polycell plastering repair wall filler to Mr Kipling cakes. In the early 1980s he also appeared in a variety of theatrical productions, including Journey's End in 1981 at the Churchill Theatre in Bromley, and Conduct Unbecoming in 1982 at the Yvonne Arnaud Theatre in Guildford.

His most prominent role, in 1981, was as Prince Mordred, son of King Arthur, in John Boorman's Excalibur.

In 1982, Addie starred in one of the few lead roles of his career in the character of Stalky in a BBC television mini-series of Rudyard Kipling's novel Stalky & Co.  

He played the role of Delahay in the film Another Country (1984).

Addie played the character of Sir Guy of Gisbourne in the 1984–1986 English television series Robin of Sherwood, a role that brought his career national exposure.

In 1989, he abandoned acting and spent several years living in Spain and the United States. 

He returned to acting in 1995, initially performing in fringe theatre original productions with the Chichester-based Exiled Theatre Company, involving regional tours in England's south provinces. In 1995 he appeared with the company in the play Shades in Time - Martyrs, involving a promenading performance within Gloucester Cathedral, and as the character of a mouse in the play Shades in Time - The Docks set at Gloucester Docks as a part of the 1995 Gloucester Festival. In late 1995, he performed with the company in Cheltenham in a theatrical monologue he wrote about a Mohammedan jihadist suicide bomber entitled Acts of Revenge, and in 1996 he appeared in the new plays by the company: Edmund, Son of Gloucester (a prequel to Shakespeare's King Lear) and Into the Mist – a play set in early medieval Scotland with Addie playing St Columba. 

After this Addie resumed a film and television career, also acting in a number of television commercials in 1998 for designer kitchens, whisky, and habit-breaking products for cigarettes.

Personal life
Addie's stepfather was Jack Williams, a highly regarded polo player, developer of the modern game and associated in the sport with both the British royal family and foreign polo players and teams, including the Sultan of Brunei, and numerous American teams. Under Williams's tutelage Addie – an imposing physical figure at 6'2" in height – became an accomplished horseman and polo player. Addie also spent time in Argentina pursuing the sport. His family's house in Sapperton in the Cotswolds, near Cirencester, meant that he was involved in polo every day through the season through much of the 1970s and early 1980s. As well as being a keen horseman, Addie was a competitive archer.

At the time of his death, Addie was divorced, having been married and divorced three times.  The marriages produced three children: Alexander, Alastair and Caitlin.

Death
Addie died on 20 November 2003 at age 43 in Cheltenham General Hospital in Gloucestershire, England from the effects of lung cancer, three weeks after the disease was diagnosed. A funeral took place at the Church of St John the Baptist, Cirencester for Addie's body, which was cremated, with his ashes being buried in the graveyard of Holy Trinity Church, Minchinhampton. 

A memorial cherry tree bearing a commemorative plaque was planted in Addie's memory in the Jack Gardner Memorial Garden in Cirencester on the tenth anniversary of his death, funded by a group of fans of his career.

Filmography

Film

Television

Theatre
 Journey's End (1981)
 Conduct Unbecoming (1982) 
 Shades in Time (1995)
 The Tell-Tale Heart (1995)
 Acts of Revenge (Co-written by Robert Addie) (1995)
 Edmund Son of Gloucester (1996)
 Into the Mist (1996)

References

External links

1960 births
2003 deaths
Alumni of RADA
English male film actors
English male stage actors
English male television actors
British expatriates in Argentina
National Youth Theatre members
People educated at Marlborough College
Deaths from lung cancer in England
People educated at Magdalen College School, Brackley
20th-century English male actors
Actors from Gloucestershire